Rieupeyroux (Languedocien: Riupeirós) is a commune in the Aveyron department in southern France.

Population

See also
Communes of the Aveyron department

References

External links

 Website

Communes of Aveyron
Aveyron communes articles needing translation from French Wikipedia